Edgar Miller may refer to:
 Edgar Miller (American football)
 Edgar Miller (artist)
 Edgar Miller (psychologist)